Mande Bori, also known as Mande Bakari and known in Arabic as Abu Bakr, is a heroic figure in Mande oral tradition who was involved in the founding of the Mali Empire. He was the brother and right-hand man of Sunjata, the founder of the empire, and served as the empire's kankoro-sigui, an office that has been translated as "viceroy" or "lieutenant-general". Though Mande Bori never himself reigned as mansa, his grandsons Musa and Suleyman ruled the Mali Empire at the apex of its power and prestige.

Mande Bori is regarded as the progenitor of the branches of the Keita clan who live in the vicinity of Kouroussa, in Hamana and Kolonkana. His is regarded as having been hot-headed, and oral tradition claims he was cursed by his sister Sogolon Kolonkan for insulting her. The story of this curse, said to prevent his descendants from ever leading an army, is used as an explanation for the relationship between and relative status of Hamana, whose residents trace their lineage to Mande Bori, and Kangaba, whose residents trace their lineage to Sunjata.

In addition to his role in the Sunjata epic, Mande Bori is also a hero of hunters, and a legend claims he was born after his mother made a pact with a hunter spirit.

Lineage
Mande Bori was the brother of Sunjata, the founder of the Mali Empire. Mande Bori and Sunjata shared a father, Maghan Kon Fatta, but whether they were full brothers or half brothers is unclear: some traditions regard Mande Bori as a son of Sunjata's mother Sogolon, whereas others regard him as the son of another of Maghan Kon Fatta's wives, Namandjé. It is also unclear whether he was the older or younger brother.

Mande Bori had at least one son, Faga Leye, who was the father of Mansa Musa. Under the Arabic form of his name Abu Bakr, Mande Bori is briefly mentioned by the 14th-century Arab historian Ibn Khaldun as Musa's ancestor.

Footnotes

References

Works cited

 
 
 
 
 
 
 
 
 

Mali Empire